Marder (Pine Marten) was a German midget submarine developed from the Neger. Another improvement was the dome through which the pilot viewed the outside world that also served as the craft's entrance and exit was made openable from the inside.

The submarine's first operations took place on the night of 2 August 1944, when Nazi Germany's Kriegsmarine'''s Small Battle Units made their largest effort of the war. 58 human torpedoes of the Neger-type and 22 Linse vessels were launched against Allied shipping off Normandy as part of a combined operation with Negers and explosive Linse boats.  One Royal Navy destroyer escort,  was sunk by a human torpedo along with one minesweeper, and one landing craft by the German motor boats; at a cost of 41 Neger and 22 Linsen craft.

References

Bibliography
 Brown, David. Warship Losses of World War Two.'' Arms and Armour, London, Great Britain, 1990. .
 

Midget submarines
World War II submarines of Germany